"Wake Up Call" is a song by American pop rock band Maroon 5. It was released on July 17, 2007, as the second single from their second studio album It Won't Be Soon Before Long (2007). The band performed the song on 45th at Night, which originally included a special guest Eve for the remix version, but never officially recorded. However, the band later requested artist Mary J. Blige, with musician Mark Ronson to work on the song's official remix version. The remix was released on November 13, 2007, and included on the album's international limited deluxe edition and both with the artists' remix albums Call and Response by the band and Soul Is Forever by Blige, all released in 2008.

It is also featured on the television shows, Entourage and The Hills. Before the release of "Wake Up Call", the band promoted by performing it a half-step lower. The song was BBC Radio 1 playlisted for the playlist week beginning July 18, 2007. As of June 2014, the song has sold 1,821,000 copies in the US.

Background
The band confirmed the song as the album's second single on MTV's Total Request Live on May 29, 2007.

Music video
The music video for "Wake Up Call" is directed by Jonas Åkerlund and was filmed in Los Angeles in July 2007. The video is presented as a trailer for an imaginary NC-17-rated film. It features Adam Levine's leading lady for the video, Kim Smith, talking with the suspicious Levine, asking for his forgiveness since she had sex with another man whom Levine doesn't know and who serves as the antagonist. As the video progresses, Levine arrives home and hears noises coming from the bedroom. He kicks down the door and catches his girlfriend cheating on him with the other man (played by Jeremy Sisto). As his girlfriend tries to break up the fight while attempting to explain the reason of her infidelity, Levine immediately shoots him in the chest, killing him in the process while his girlfriend watched in horror as her lover dies. Levine covers up the body and drags it out of the bedroom. The rest of the video centers around the other members of Maroon 5 whom they committed different crimes, while Levine and Smith are going through an elaborate plan to cover up the murder. At the end of the video, Levine gets arrested and taken to custody.

Director's cut version
A director's cut version of the video includes additional scenes from the original video, with James Valentine giving the finger while getting a mug shot and the ending scene where Levine getting sentenced to death for the murder.

Track listing

Charts and certifications

Weekly charts

Year-end charts

Certifications

Release history

References

2007 singles
2007 songs
A&M Octone Records singles
Maroon 5 songs
Mark Ronson songs
Mary J. Blige songs
Music videos directed by Jonas Åkerlund
Wake Up Call (Remix)
Song recordings produced by Mike Elizondo
Song recordings produced by Spike Stent
Songs about infidelity
Songs written by Adam Levine
Songs written by James Valentine (musician)
Songs written by Mike Elizondo